Bunodosoma is a genus of sea anemones in the family Actiniidae.

Species
Species in the genus include:

 Bunodosoma biscayense (Fischer, 1874)
 Bunodosoma caissarum Corrêa in Belém, 1987
 Bunodosoma californicum Carlgren, 1951
 Bunodosoma cangicum Belém & Preslercravo, 1973
 Knobbly anemone (Bunodosoma capense (Lesson, 1830))
 Bunodosoma cavernatum (Bosc, 1802)
 Bunodosoma diadema (Drayton in Dana, 1846)
 Bunodosoma fallax (Pax, 1922)
 Bunodosoma goanense den Hartog & Vennam, 1993
 Bunodosoma grande (Verrill, 1869)
 Bunodosoma granuliferum (Le Sueur, 1817
 Bunodosoma kuekenthali Pax, 1910
 Bunodosoma sphaerulatum Duerden, 1902

References

Actiniidae
Hexacorallia genera